This is a list of theatres in Natal, Rio Grande do Norte, Brazil.

List 

 
Theatres